NT or nt may refer to:

Language
 Nt (digraph), a letter in several African languages
 n't, a contracted form of the English word not

Music
 Neighbor tone, a nonchord tone that passes from a chord tone directly above or below it and resolves to the same tone
 "N.T.", a song by Kool & the Gang from the 1971 album Live at PJ's
 "N.T.", a song by Q-Tip from the 1999 album Amplified

Organisations
 National Trust, a British heritage conservation charity
 Royal National Theatre, London, England
 New Trier High School, Winnetka, Illinois, United States
 Nortel (stock symbol: NT), a telecommunications equipment company

Places
 Northern Territory, Australia
 Northwest Territories, Canada
 New Territories, Hong Kong
 Netherlands Antilles (1954–2010), Caribbean, by FIPS 10-4 code
 Saudi Arabian–Iraqi neutral zone (1922–1991), by ISO 3166-1 code

Science
 Nanotesla (nT), an SI unit of magnetic flux density
 Nit (unit) (nt), a non-SI name for a unit of luminance
 Niton (element) (Nt), obsolete name of the element radon

Biology and medicine
 Near-threatened species, a category in the IUCN Red List
 Neurotransmitter, chemical signals used in communication between neurons
 Normotension, normal level of blood pressure
 Nuchal translucency scan, a sonographic prenatal screening scan
 Nucleotide, a chemical compound making up DNA or RNA
 Nuclear transfer, the scientific technique used to clone animals
 FloraNT (Index herbariorum code for Northern Territory Herbarium in Alice Springs)

Technology
 Nested Task flag, a flag in the FLAGS register of Intel x86 processors
 Windows NT, a family of operating systems from Microsoft
 Network termination, a device connecting the customer's data or telephone equipment to the local exchange carrier's line
 NT (cassette), a Sony microcassette-based digital memo recorder
 Analogue Nt, an aftermarket Nintendo Entertainment System

Transport
 Net tonnage, a measurement used for ships
 Binter Canarias (IATA airline designator)
 Zeppelin NT, a type of German airship manufactured since the 1990s

Other uses
 New Taiwan dollar (NT$ or NT), the currency of Taiwan
 Norrköpings Tidningar, a Swedish newspaper
 Newfoundland Time, a time zone in Atlantic Canada
 Neurotypical or neurologically typical, someone whose brain development and activity are typical
 New Testament, the second part of the Christian Bible
 Intuitive thinker, one of the Myers–Briggs Type Indicators
 National Teacher, teacher in a National school (Ireland)
 North Takoma, a posited fictional state in which the town of Springfield is located in The Simpsons TV show
 No Trump, in contract bridge and other card games

See also
 Neutronium, a hypothetical substance composed purely of neutrons
 Neo Tokyo (disambiguation), a fictional futuristic version of Tokyo